Lima: Breaking the Silence is a 1999 American crime-drama film directed and written by Menahem Golan, starring Joe Lara and Billy Drago. The story is based on the 1996-1997 Japanese embassy hostage crisis at the Embassy of Japan in Lima, Peru.

Cast 
 Joe Lara as Victor
 Billy Drago as General Monticito Frantacino
 Christopher Atkins as Jeff
 Bentley Mitchum as Bruce Nelson
 Julie St. Claire as Elena

See also 
 Japanese embassy hostage crisis

References

External links 
 
 

1999 films
1999 crime drama films
Films scored by Robert O. Ragland
Nu Image films
Films set in Peru
American films based on actual events
Films produced by Menahem Golan
Films directed by Menahem Golan
Films with screenplays by Menahem Golan
1990s English-language films